Gabriel Celaya (full name: Rafael Gabriel Juan Múgica Celaya Leceta; March 18, 1911 in Hernani, Gipuzkoa – April 18, 1991 in Madrid) was a Spanish poet. Gabriel settled in Madrid and studied engineering, working for a time as a Manager in his family's business.

Gabriel met Federico García Lorca, José Moreno Villa and other intellectuals who inspired him towards writing around 1927-1935, after which he devoted his writing entirely to poetry. In 1946 he founded the collection of the poems "Norte" with its inseparable Amparo Gastón and since then, he abandoned his engineering profession and his family's business.

The poetry collection "Norte" was intended to bridge between the gap of the poetry of the generation of 1927, the exile and Europe.

In 1946, he published the prose book "Tentativas" in which he signed as Gabriel Celaya for the first time. This is the first stage  of existentialist character.

Along with Eugenio de Nora and Blas de Otero, he supported the idea of a non-elitist poetry in the service of the majority, "to transform the world".

In 1956, he won the Critics Award for his book "De claro en claro".

When this model of social poetry was in crisis, Celaya returned to his poetic origins. He published 'La linterna sorda' ('The lantern deaf') and reedited poems belonging prior to 1936. He also tested the experimentalism and concrete poetry 'Campos Semánticos'('semantic fields') (1971).

Between 1977 and 1980 their  Obras Completas  were published in five volumes.
In 1986 he won a national prize for Spanish literature by the Ministry of Culture, the same year when he published “Open world”.

In short, the work of Celaya is a great synthesis of almost all the concerns and styles of Spanish poetry of 20th century.

Celaya died on April 18, 1991 in Madrid and his remains were scattered in his native Hernani.

Works 

Poetry
Marea del silencio, 1935
La soledad cerrada, 1947
Movimientos elementales, 1947
Tranquilamente hablando, 1947 (firmado como Juan de Leceta)
Objetos poéticos, 1948
El principio sin fín, 1949
Se parece al amor, 1949
Las cosas como son, 1949
Deriva, Alicante, 1950
Las cartas boca arriba, 1951
Lo demás es silencio, 1952
Paz y concierto, 1953
Ciento volando (con Amparo Gastón), 1953
Vía muerta, 1954
La poesía es un arma cargada de futuro, 1954
Cantos iberos, 1955
Coser y cantar (con Amparo Gastón), 1955
De claro en claro, 1956
Entreacto, 1957
Las resistencias del diamante, 1957
Música celestial (con Amparo Gastón), 1958
Cantata en Aleixandre, 1959
El corazón en su sitio, 1959
Para vosotros dos, 1960
Poesía urgente, 1960
La buena vida, 1961
Los poemas de Juan de Leceta, 1961
Rapsodia eúskara, 1961
Episodios nacionales, 1962
Mazorcas, 1962
Versos de otoño, 1963
Dos cantatas, 1963
La linterna sorda, 1964
Baladas y decires vascos, 1965
Lo que faltaba, 1967
Poemas de Rafael Múgica, 1967
Los espejos transparentes, 1968
Canto en lo mío, 1968
Poesías completas, 1969
Operaciones poéticas, 1971
Campos semánticos, 1971
Dirección prohibida, 1973
Función de Uno, 1973
El derecho y el revés, 1973
La hija de Arbigorriya, 1975
Buenos días, buenas noches, 1978
Parte de guerra, 1977
Poesías completas (Tomo I-VI), 1977-80
Iberia sumergida, 1978
Poemas órficos, 1981
Penúltimos poemas, 1982
Cantos y mitos, 1984
Trilogía vasca, 1984
El mundo abierto, 1986
Orígenes / Hastapenak, 1990
Poesías completas, 2001-04
Essays
El arte como lenguaje, 1951
Poesía y verdad, 1959
Juan Manuel Caneja, 1959
Exploración de la poesía, 1964
Castilla, a cultural reader (con Phyllis Turnbull), 1960
Inquisición de la poesía, 1972
La voz de los niños, 1972
Bécquer, 1972
Los espacios de Chillida, 1974
Lo que faltaba de Gabriel Celaya, 1984
Reflexiones sobre mi poesía, 1987
Ensayos literarios, 2009
Prose
Taradez, 4003
Tentativas, 1946
Lázaro calla, 1949
Penúltimas tentativas, 1960
Lo uno y lo otro, 1962
Los buenos negocios, 1965
Memorias inmemoriales, 1980
Drama
El relevo, 1963
Ritos y farsas. Obra teatral completa, 1985

References 

1911 births
1991 deaths
Spanish poets
Spanish male poets